Holacanthus passer (king angelfish or passer angelfish) is a large marine angelfish of the family Pomacanthidae. Its large size and bright colors make it a popular aquarium fish, even though it can be difficult to keep.

Distribution

Description
Males and females are visually identical. They do, however undergo significant changes in coloration and to a lesser degree shape as they mature.
Juvenile king angelfish are primarily yellow, with fins rimmed with iridescent blue, blue striping towards the posterior of their bodies, and an orange mask around the eye. Sexually mature king angelfish, on the other hand, have mostly brown or blue bodies (depending on the light) with the same blue rimming around the fins and a yellow tail. 
King angelfish generally grow to 35 cm long. They have between 18 and 20 rays in their dorsal fin and each of their pectoral fins, and 17 to 19 in their anal fin. They also have a strong spike under their lower cheek for defensive purposes.

Habitat and diet
King angelfish primarily inhabit the middle and bottom of the water column of rocky tropical reefs, including in the larger crevices between rocks, and juveniles can occasionally be found in tide pools. They are diurnal and feed on sponges, other sessile invertebrates, zooplankton, and certain species of benthic microalgae. King angelfish also clean scalloped hammerhead sharks.

In aquariums
King angelfish are somewhat popular as aquarium fish; however, their large size, specialized diet, and high cost make them comparatively poor pets. They have not bred in captivity and hence can be very difficult to find in most hobby shops, although they are slightly more available through mail order companies.
King angelfish also have a well-deserved reputation for being difficult to keep, largely because they require sponges and tunicates as a food source and will often not accept prepared foods, even ones that contain sponges or tunicates as ingredients. 

They are not particularly picky about salinity or pH, so long as these are kept stable and the water quality high.

Angelfish in general are not generally good community inhabitants, king angels being no exception. If they are introduced when young, a lucky aquarist may be able to keep two angels in one appropriately size aquarium, but such experiences tend to be the exception, not the norm. King angelfish are quite dominant and can be abusive to smaller or more docile tankmates, or angelfish that are lower on the social hierarchy for whatever reason.

Reproduction
King angelfish are monogamous within their pairs and, during their spawning cycle, will mate daily around sunset. During a spawning cycle a pair can produce upwards of ten million fertilized eggs, averaging about 25,000–75,000 daily. These eggs then drift in the water column for about 20 hours, at which point they hatch. After hatching, the finless fry live off their yolk sack until it is completely absorbed, at which point they begin to eat small zooplankton.

References

External links
 

king angelfish
Commercial fish
Fish of the Gulf of California
Western Central American coastal fauna
Galápagos Islands coastal fauna
king angelfish